Trichaeta aurantiobasis is a moth in the subfamily Arctiinae. It was described by Walter Rothschild in 1910. It is found in Papua, Indonesia, where it is only known from Fakfak.

References

Moths described in 1910
Arctiinae